Fenglin Bridge  is a  suspension bridge near Xingyi, Guizhou province of China. It is among the 25 highest bridges in the world. The bridge is located on S65 Expressway and crosses the Maling River (马别河) Canyon. The Maling River is a tributary of the Nanpan River. The bridge opened on the 1st of March 2021.

See also
List of highest bridges in the world

References

External links
Malinghe Bridge Fenglin

Suspension bridges in China
Bridges in Guizhou
Xingyi, Guizhou